Sheikh Yasser al-Habib ( born 20 January 1979) is a Kuwaiti Twelver Shia scholar, and the head of the London-based Khoddam Al-Mahdi Organization, as well as Al-Muhassin mosque in Fulmer, Buckinghamshire, and the writer of The Lady of Heaven. Al-Habib's work focuses on Islamic history, drawing on Shia and Sunni sources.

Al-Habib started his religious activities in Kuwait, starting off as a member of the Dawah Party, later he founded a non-profit religious organization named Khoddam Al-Mahdi Organization, and he also expressed his religious views regarding Abu Bakr and Umar, and criticized them sharply, which led to anger the mainstream Sunnis in Kuwait and other Arabic-speaking Sunni communities, and finally led to the arrest of Al-Habib. Later, in February 2004 he was released under an annual pardon announced by the Emir of Kuwait on the occasion of the country's National Day, but his rearrest was ordered a few days later. Al-Habib fled Kuwait before he was sentenced in absentia to 10 years imprisonment, and spent months in Iraq and Iran before gaining an asylum in United Kingdom.

Early life
Al-Habib was interviewed by Elaph, a well-known Arabic online newspaper, where he stated that he was born in a religious Kuwaiti family, and started his education in the Kuwaiti governmental schools, before joining Kuwait University and graduating from its Political sciences faculty. Besides his secular studies, Al-Habib stated that he studied the traditional Islamic sciences under the guidance of his teacher Ayatollah Mohammed Reza Shirazi.

In 2001, he founded Khoddam Al-Mahdi Organization in Kuwait.

Imprisonment
Al-Habib was reportedly arrested on the afternoon of 30 November 2003 in connection with an audio cassette recording of a lecture he gave to an audience of 10 to 20 people in a closed environment on Islamic historical issues.

On 20 January 2004, he was reportedly convicted of “questioning the conduct and integrity of some of the ‘companions’ of the prophet Muhammad” in a lecture he had delivered, and sentenced to 10 years in prison in Kuwait.

However, his imprisonment was cut short in 2004 by a royal pardon on the occasion of the country's National Day, but his rearrest was ordered a few days later as his name was included in the royal pardon through a clerical error.  He fled the country first to Iraq, then to Iran. Then he went to London and was able gain asylum in Britain.

Now he works in Fulmer, Buckinghamshire, and had started his religious and political activity such as founding Al Muhassin Mosque and setting up Fadak (TV channel).

Views
He recorded two lectures in English titled: Who killed the Prophet Muhammad and Why do Shiites hate Umar Ibn al-Khattab.
Sunni Al-Sha'ab newspaper described Sheikh al-Habib as a traitor and apostate in its main page, at the time that Al-Habib cursed Abu Bakr and Umar.

Wahhabism
Al-Habib said:

Views on Sunnis
Sheikh al-Habib refers to Sunnis as Bakris, meaning the followers of Abu Bakr. He says that the real Sunnis (Ahlul Sunnah) are the ones who follow the Sunnah of Muhammad, that is Shia Muslims. He continues that Sunnis today follow the Sunnah and teachings of Abu Bakr instead, having rejected Ali ibn Abi Talib and Ahlulbayt. He explains in one of his lectures titled Bakris think they are Sunnis, but in reality are not that when people wanted to distance themselves from the Shia, and follow Muawiyya, they started calling themselves the Jama'ah. He explains that the reality behind why people called themselves Ahlul Sunnah wal Jama'ah only began after the Umayyad ruler Umar bin Abdul Aziz forbade the Sunnah (tradition) of cursing Ali ibn Abi Talib publicly (as previously invented by Muawiyah). It was upon then that people protested to this new prohibition, declaring that Umar bin Abdul Aziz had prohibited the Sunnah of cursing Ali ibn Abi Talib. Thus they began calling themselves Ahlul Sunnah wal Jama'ah; stressing that they adhere to the Sunnah of cursing Ali ibn Abi Talib, and that they are the Jama'ah of Muawiyah.

He also refers to those whom claim to be Shi'a but do not denounce Abu Bakr, Umar, Aisha and other personalities in Islamic history such as Khalid ibn al-Walid, as Batris.

He described Mohammad Hussein Fadlallah (the Lebanese marja who died on 4 July 2010) as Batri. Al-Habib said that Fadlallah left a great number of doctrinal deviations, ignorant views and bad conduct which he introduced to the religion of Islam.

Celebrating Aisha's death anniversary and its reaction
In September 2010, al-Habib angered the Sunni Muslims by calling Aisha, "an enemy of God" which led Kuwait to revoke his citizenship accusing him of trying to stir up discord among Muslims.

In October 2010, Iranian Supreme Leader Ali Khamenei tried to calm tensions between Shias and Sunnis by issuing a fatwa against insulting Muhammad's companions and wives.

Criticism
After Iranian Supreme Leader Ali Khamenei issued the fatwa outlawing the insult of Sunni Dignitaries (Aisha, Abu Bakr and Umar ibn al-Khattāb), Al-Habib responded by calling the Islamic Republic of Iran "oppressive". He continued by referring to Khamenei as "so-called Ali al-Khamenei – who pretends to be a Shia scholar". His reasoning for naming the Iranian government as "oppressive" was because the "regime in Iran today unjustly arrests anyone who celebrates the occasion of Farhat-ul-Zahra and prevents people from visiting the tomb of Abu Lulu".

Senior Iranian cleric Naser Makarem Shirazi has referred to Al-Habib as a "hired agent or a mad man" and stated: "Recently, an illiterate fool non clergy U.K citizen in the name of Shia has insulted sacred matters of Sunni Muslim brothers".

Al-Habib has been criticized by several figures and leaders who claim to speak in the name of Shiism including leader of Hezbollah Hassan Nasrallah and Ali Khamenei (who also issued a fatwa against insulting of Muhammad's companions) and Naser Makarem Shirazi.

Works 
Yasser al-Habib has published many books and articles throughout the years, here are some of his works.

Bibliography

Filmography 

 The Lady of Heaven

References

External links
 

1979 births
Living people
Kuwaiti Shia Muslims
Kuwaiti religious leaders
Kuwaiti people of Iranian descent
Stateless people
Shia scholars of Islam
Critics of atheism
Critics of Sunni Islam
Critics of Wahhabism
21st-century Muslim scholars of Islam
Islamic scholars in the United Kingdom